Panovka is a rural locality (a selo) in Ust-Gryaznukhinskoye Rural Settlement, Kamyshinsky District, Volgograd Oblast, Russia. The population was 234 as of 2010. There are 4 streets.

Geography 
Panovka is located on the right bank of the Volga River, 68 km north of Kamyshin (the district's administrative centre) by road. Gvardeyskoye is the nearest rural locality.

References 

Rural localities in Kamyshinsky District